Dartmouth is a town in Victoria, Australia.

It was established in 1973 as a construction camp for workers working on the Dartmouth Dam and the Post Office opened on 1 March 1973. (An earlier Post Office had existed in the rural locality from 1910 until 1930).

The dam was built very close to the mouth of the Dart river where it joined the Mitta Mitta river and is a major reservoir in the Murray-Darling River system, on the Mitta Mitta River.  Today Dartmouth is a village with a permanent population around 45 people. It caters to fisherman, tourists and local workers who maintain the dam and the now two power stations.

While the dam was being built by the SR&WSC of Victoria the population was around 2000, many of those people were employed by Thiess Bros.

Climate

Although rainfall records span as far back as 1918, temperature records did not commence until 1975. Winter is twice as wet as summer, and occasionally it may snow.

References

Towns in Victoria (Australia)
Shire of Towong